George Gordon (1806–1879) was a British botanist. He worked for the London Horticultural Society as Foreman of the Horticultural Society Gardens at Chiswick, near London.

Gordon is particularly noted for his work on conifers, publishing The Pinetum in 1858, followed by a Supplement in 1862 and a fully revised second edition of The Pinetum in 1875. He described many new species of conifers from specimens collected by Karl Theodor Hartweg in Mexico and California.

References

1806 births
1879 deaths
Botanists with author abbreviations
British botanists
Botanists active in North America